Dughanlu (also Romanized as Dughānlu and Dowghānlū; also known as Doghanloo, Doghānlū and Dūgānlu) is a village in Karasf Rural District, in the Central District of Khodabandeh County, Zanjan Province, Iran. At the 2006 census, its population was 95, in 20 families.

References 

Populated places in Khodabandeh County